Eupithecia exicterata is a moth in the family Geometridae. It is found in Afghanistan and the western Himalayas (Pakistan and India).

References

Moths described in 2008
exicterata
Moths of Asia